The 2015 World Club Series was the inaugural World Club Series and was contested by six clubs (three each from the Super League and National Rugby League), including Super League XIX champions, St Helens R.F.C. and 2014 NRL Premiers, the South Sydney Rabbitohs. The 2015 series marked a departure from the previous format, whereby only the premiers from the two respective competitions would take part.

Background
In September 2014 it was announced that the World Club Series would be overhauled to include six clubs – three each from the Super League and Australia's National Rugby League. The 2015 series will take place between 22–25 February, and will feature three matches, the first and second essentially being two exhibition games and the final game being for the Championship trophy between the two respective premiers as in previous years.

Other than the two aforementioned teams, it was also announced that Super League clubs the Warrington Wolves and Wigan Warriors, as well as National Rugby League clubs the St. George Illawarra Dragons and Brisbane Broncos would also take part.

Series details

Series Score

Game 1

Game 2

World Club Challenge

St. Helens Rugby League Football Club
Saints finished Super League XIX's regular season in 1st place and on 11 October 2014 defeated defending premiers the Wigan Warriors 14 - 6 in the 2014 Super League Grand Final, qualifying the Saints for their sixth World Club Challenge overall.

South Sydney Rabbitohs

The Rabbitohs finished the 2014 NRL season in third place and on 5 October 2014 defeated the 7th-placed Canterbury-Bankstown Bulldogs 30 - 6 in the 2014 NRL Grand Final, qualifying South Sydney for their first World Club Challenge.

References

2015 in Australian rugby league
2015 in English rugby league
World Club Challenge
St Helens R.F.C. matches
South Sydney Rabbitohs matches